The Luohe–Fuyang railway is a railway line in China.

The line opened in stages and was fully opened on 30 October 1990.

Connections 

 Luohe: Beijing–Guangzhou railway, Luohe–Baofeng railway
 Fuyang: Beijing–Kowloon railway, Qinglongshan–Fuyang railway, Fuyang–Lu'an railway, Fuyang-Huainan railway

References 

Railway lines in China